Emerson Elementary School may refer to:

 Emerson Elementary School (Amarillo, Texas)
 Emerson Elementary School (Ann Arbor, Michigan)
 Emerson Elementary School (Berwyn, Illinois)
 Emerson Elementary School (Burbank, California)
 Emerson Elementary School (Compton, California)
 Emerson Elementary School (Dayton, Ohio)
 Emerson Elementary School (Madison, Wisconsin)
 Emerson Spanish Immersion Learning Center (Minneapolis, Minnesota)
 Emerson Elementary School (Muncie, Indiana)
 Emerson Elementary School (Oakland, California)
 Emerson Elementary School (Westchase, Houston Texas)
 Emerson Elementary School (Westerville, Ohio)
 Emerson Elementary School (Winnipeg, Manitoba)